Long Marston may refer to:
Long Marston, Hertfordshire
Long Marston, North Yorkshire
Long Marston, Warwickshire (formerly in Gloucestershire)
Long Marston Airfield
RAF Long Marston